Pinggot Zulueta (born 19 June 1961) is a Filipino visual artist and photojournalist.

Biography
Zulueta grew up in Tarlac, Philippines and attained his Fine Arts degree in Painting from the University of Santo Tomas, where he served as staff artist for The Varsitarian. He then continued his studies at the UP College of Fine Arts. He also attended an advanced course on news photography and pictorial layout conducted by Berlin's International Institute of Journalism during its visit to Manila in 1996. He later worked as a political cartoonist for Midweek Magazine and Abante. He has also been a lifestyle photographer for both Diyaryo Filipino and Manila Bulletin.

Zulueta's art style centers on social commentary and abstraction. Since 1983, his work has been exhibited in the Philippines, New Zealand, Australia, and the United States. He also appears in EDSA 2: A Nation in Revolt and collaborated on the UNESCO children's book Mga Alagad ng Mahiwagang Sirkulo.

Selected exhibitions

 Solo exhibitions
 1985, April: TILAMSIK at Silahis International Hotel, Manila, Philippines
 2002, September: ASINTA: Images and Imageries at RCBC Plaza Main Lobby, Makati, Philippines
 2005, December: AOTEAROA SERIES at Philippine Center, New York City, USA
 2013, March: VIAJES at Galeria Francesca in the SM Megamall, Mandaluyong, Philippines
 2013, November: MAKATULOG KA PA KAYA? (in collaboration with Virgilio Almario) at Crucible Gallery in the SM Megamall, Mandaluyong, Philippines
 Group exhibitions
 1983, April: NTRODUCTIONS ’ 83 at the Cultural Center of the Philippines, Manila, Philippines
 1983, September: WALANG PAMAGAT at the University of the Philippines, Philippines
 1984, March: LINE DRAWINGS at the UP Vargas Museum, Manila, Philippines
 1997, August: ART ASSOCIATION OF THE PHILIPPINES Annual  Exhibition at the GSIS Museo ng Sining, Pasay, Philippines
 2001, February: POWER OF THE PEOPLE Through the Eyes of Filipino Photojournalists at Robinsons Galleria, Manila, Philippines
 2003, August: ON ARRIVAL at the Bashford Gallery, Auckland City, New Zealand
 2007, December: SMASH HITS at Parramatta Artists Studios, Sydney, Australia
 2008, January: AMNESTY INTERNATIONAL FREEDOM ART EXHIBITION at Tap Gallery, Sydney, Australia
 2011, January BRUSHSTROKES TOWARDS 400 at University of Santo Tomas, Manila, Philippines
 2012, April: KRISTO MANILA 2012, SO BE IT at Gallery Nine in the SM Megamall, Mandaluyong, Philippines
 2012, September: PAPELISMO: Works on Paper at the Crucible Gallery in the SM Megamall, Mandaluyong, Philippines
 2012, September: RECOLLECTIONS 1081 at Liongoren Gallery, Quezon City, Philippines
 2012, October: MANILART 12 at Galeria Francesca in the SMX Convention Center, Pasay, Philippines
 2013: ART FILIPINO: Works by Filipino Artists at the Asian Arts Gallery, Maryland, USA

Awards

References

1961 births
Living people
Filipino artists
University of Santo Tomas alumni
University of the Philippines alumni
People from Tarlac